Ryno Joseph Barnes (born 5 November 1981) is a South African professional rugby union footballer, who most recently played with the . His regular playing position is hooker.

Career

Western Province

Barnes started his senior career with Cape Town-based  during the 2006 Vodacom Cup.

Falcons

Barnes made his debut in the Currie Cup in 2007, coming on as a substitute in the Falcons' match against  in Brakpan. He played in ten of the Falcons matches during the 2007 Currie Cup Premier Division – scoring one try against the  – but could not prevent them finishing bottom of the log.

Griquas / Royal XV / Cheetahs

Barnes, however, continued to play at Premier Division level as he made the move to Kimberley-based side  for the 2009 season. After making eight starts during the 2009 Vodacom Cup to help Griquas lift the trophy for the fourth time, he was also called up to a Highveld XV that played against the British & Irish Lions during their 2009 tour to South Africa. Barnes scored a first-half try in his side's spirited 25–37 loss to the touring side.

His performances for the Peacock Blues in also led to him being included in the  Super Rugby team for the 2010 Super 14 season.

Barnes played in all fourteen of ' matches during the 2010 Currie Cup Premier Division, scoring two tries to help them finish in sixth position in the competition.

2011 saw Barnes once again be a key player for the  during the 2011 Super Rugby season, making thirteen appearances including a spell during which he started eight consecutive matches for the side.

Hercú Liebenberg was the preferred back-up choice to Cheetahs first-choice hooker Adriaan Strauss, which led to Barnes being involved more in ' 2012 Vodacom Cup campaign. He made nine appearances for Griquas during the 2012 Currie Cup Premier Division as they finished fifth in a now-reduced six-team league to avoid playing in a relegation play-off match.

The 2013 Super Rugby season saw Barnes return to the Cheetahs squad as backup to Adriaan Strauss. He was named on the bench for all 17 of their matches (16 regular season matches, plus the Cheetahs' first ever play-off appearance), but only played off the bench on eight occasions. Barnes started both the 21–19 victory in Kimberley and the 33–15 defeat in Nelspruit as Griquas lost their Premier Division status.

He played in all ten matches in the competition (although Martin Bezuidenhout was the regular starting hooker) as Griquas finished seventh in the competition.

Coincidentally, Barnes' final game for Griquas also turned out to be his 100th match for the side.

Free State Cheetahs

External links
 
 Ryno Barnes at itsrugby.co.uk

References

Living people
1981 births
South African rugby union players
Rugby union hookers
Cheetahs (rugby union) players
Rugby union players from Cape Town
Alumni of Paarl Gimnasium
Griquas (rugby union) players
Western Province (rugby union) players
Falcons (rugby union) players